Raja Muhammad Zulqarnain Khan is a Kashmiri politician who served as the President of Azad Jammu and Kashmir from 25 August 2006 to 25 August 2011. He was replaced by Sardar Muhammad Yaqoob Khan. Prior to this he served as Member of the Legislative Assembly of Azad Kashmir. He hails from Bhimber, a district in Azad Kashmir near to Gujrat District of pakistan. He belongs to a feudal family which owns much land in bhimber kasgumma.

External links
 Presidents of Azad Jammu and Kashmir
 Government of Azad Kashmir
 Pakistani rulers

 

Year of birth missing (living people)
Raja
People from Azad Kashmir
Living people
Presidents of Azad Kashmir
Lawrence College Ghora Gali alumni